Jaime dela Rosa Fresnedi (born April 27, 1950), also known as Jimmy Fresnedi, is a Filipino politician currently serving as a member of the Philippine House of Representatives representing the Lone District of Muntinlupa, Metro Manila. He served as mayor of Muntinlupa from 1998 to 2007 and from 2013 to 2022.

Early and personal life 

Fresnedi was born on April 27, 1950. He is married to Loreta Obong, with whom he has a son named Joma and a grandson named Neo. They reside in the Villa Carolina subdivision in Tunasan, Muntinlupa.

Political career 

Fresnedi first entered politics in 1986 when he was appointed as an officer-in-charge of Muntinlupa, then a municipality, following the People Power Revolution that formed a new government under President Corazon Aquino. He served the role alongside lawyer, journalist, and businessman Ignacio Bunye. In 1988, Fresnedi and Bunye contested the first local election under the new Constitution of the Philippines with the latter as mayor and the former as vice mayor. The tandem served three terms together until 1998, three years after Muntinlupa was formally converted into a highly urbanized city and established its own legislative district in the Philippine House of Representatives for the 1998 election. In 1998, Bunye opted to run for the inaugural position, which prompted Fresnedi to run for mayor; both were successful.

Mayor of Muntinlupa 

During his first term as Mayor of Muntinlupa, Fresnedi established the regional offices of the Registry of Deeds (now the Land Registration Authority), the Land Transportation Office, and the National Bureau of Investigation in the city.

Fresnedi won two re-election bids for mayor in 2001 and 2004. Under the Constitution, he was barred from seeking a fourth consecutive term; in 2007, his wife Loreta ran for the mayoral post, but she lost to Vice Mayor Aldrin San Pedro. When Fresnedi was eligible to run again for mayor in 2010, he ran again but also lost to San Pedro, who was in his second term as mayor. In 2013, Fresnedi contested San Pedro again and was successful, defeating him by 4,280 votes.

In February 2015, Fresnedi presented a single-step transaction system for the registration of business licenses in Muntinlupa. He said that the innovation aims to improve the city's economic growth and overall competitiveness in the business and economics sector. The system was presented in the 2014 World Cities Summit in Singapore.

In 2019, the Bureau of Internal Revenue reported that Muntinlupa had the highest local revenue collection in Metro Manila with  collected,  of which was corporate tax.

Residents also filed charges of administrative raps, gross misconduct, gross negligence, and abuse of power against Fresnedi before the Ombudsman claiming that he had violated the Government Procurement Act (Republic Act No. 9184) and the Local Government Code (Republic Act No. 7160) by allegedly ratifying the extension of employment contracts that had already expired as "urgent". According to the residents, Fresnedi compelled the Muntinlupa city council to pass a resolution authorizing him to extend the contract of Linde plc and four other entities through lump sum transactions. A councilor denied that the city council issued such a resolution.

Fresnedi's government partnered with the Technical Education and Skills Development Authority for the program.

In Fresnedi's tenure as Mayor of Muntinlupa, the city received the Seal of Good Local Governance by the Department of the Interior and Local Government in 2015 and 2019. Muntinlupa was also awarded the "Most Business-Friendly LGU" by the Philippine Chamber of Commerce and Industry in 2017 and 2018 and a special citation in 2019.

Education 

Since 2013, Fresnedi's government has been pushing for inclusion in the scholarship program of Muntinlupa.

In October 2017, Fresnedi was awarded the "Model Local Chief Executive Award" by the Association of Local Colleges and Universities and the Commission on Higher Education.

In 2018, Fresnedi and Muntinlupa Representative Ruffy Biazon initiated a project to construct additional school buildings for the city's public schools.

In 2019, the Philippine Department of Education reported that Muntinlupa had the largest amount of scholarship beneficiaries in the country with over 65,000 scholars. Fresnedi hailed the achievement in his 2019 State of the City address, noting the increase from 5,581 scholars when he was re-elected in 2013.

Emergency response 

In 2017, Fresnedi's government mandated the construction of a new fire station in Tunasan, which was recognized by the Bureau of Fire Protection as the "Best Fire Station" in 2018.

In September 2018, Fresnedi led the donation of eight ambulance units worth  to nine barangays in the city.

In March 2019, Fresnedi led the donation of ten fire trucks worth  to nine barangays in the city.

2022 Congress bid 
Fresnedi, being term-limited as mayor, will run for representative of the lone district of Muntinlupa in 2022 under the One Muntinlupa local party, switching places with incumbent representative Ruffy Biazon, who is the party's standard bearer for mayor. He won the race.

See also 
 List of mayors of Metro Manila

References

External links 
 City government website profile

1950 births
Living people
20th-century Filipino lawyers
Liberal Party (Philippines) politicians
Mayors of Muntinlupa
Members of the House of Representatives of the Philippines from Muntinlupa
Lakas–CMD (1991) politicians